The Keighley Bus Company operates both local and regional bus services in West Yorkshire, England. It is a subsidiary of Transdev Blazefield, which operates bus services across Greater Manchester, Lancashire, North Yorkshire and West Yorkshire.

History
When founded, the company was part of Tilling & British Automobile Traction. In 1927, following the company's expansion, Tilling & British Automobile Traction was renamed West Yorkshire Road Car Company, to reflect the wider service area provided.

In 1948, along with other companies that were then part of the Tilling Group, West Yorkshire Road Car Company was nationalised.

In 1968, West Yorkshire Road Car Company became a subsidiary of the National Bus Company.

In September 1987, AJS Group purchased West Yorkshire Road Car Company from the National Bus Company. The business was subsequently split into smaller companies, one of which became Keighley & District Travel.

In August 1991, Keighley & District Travel was included in the purchase of AJS Group by Blazefield Group, following the sale of seven of the company's eight remaining bus firms at the time – a deal valued at £2.2 million.

In January 2006, French-based operator Transdev acquired the Blazefield Group, along with 305 vehicles. Locally, the company was rebranded under the name Transdev in Keighley.

In July 2016, the company was again rebranded, now operating as The Keighley Bus Company.

Services and branding

The Keighley Bus Company 
The process of rebranding to The Keighley Bus Company commenced in July 2016, which saw the introduction of a two-tone green livery, as well as the investment of in the region of £2 million in new vehicles. A number of local bus services operate under this brand, including services 62 (Ilkley and Keighley), 67 (Bradford and Keighley) and 72 (Grassington and Skipton). The two-tone green livery is also used as a base for other brands, including Brontë Bus and Keighley Jets.

AireLine 
The AireLine brand is used on service 60, which operates between Leeds and Keighley via Shipley, running along the route of the River Aire. The service is operated by a fleet of Volvo B9TL/Wright Eclipse Gemini double-deck vehicles, branded in a red and green livery. Features include free WiFi, USB charging and audio-visual next stop announcements. The service was previously operated by Optare Versa single-deck vehicles, which were introduced in October 2017.

Brontë Bus 
The Brontë Bus brand encompasses three services, which operate at a combined frequency of up to every 20 minutes between Haworth and Keighley. Services then extend hourly to Stanbury (B1), Oakworth (B2) and Hebden Bridge (B3). The service is operated by a fleet of Volvo B7RLE/Wright Eclipse Urban single-deck vehicles, branded in a two-tone green livery. Features include free WiFi and USB charging. The service was previously operated by a fleet of Wright StreetLite single-deck vehicles, which served the route between May 2015 and May 2017.

DalesWay 
The DalesWay brand is used on service 66, which operates between Keighley and Skipton. The service is operated by a fleet of Volvo B9TL/Wright Eclipse Gemini 2 double-deck vehicles. Features include free WiFi, USB charging and next stop audio-visual announcements.

In February 2021, DalesWay was permanently upgraded to a double-deck vehicles, following an increase in passenger numbers prior to the COVID-19 pandemic. Prior to the upgrade, the service was operated by a fleet of Optare Versa single-deck vehicles, which were introduced in September 2016.

Keighley Jets 
The Keighley Jets brand encompasses a total of seventeen local bus services, which operate in and around the market town of Keighley. Services are operated by a fleet of Mellor Strata minibuses and Optare Solo single-deck buses, which are branded in a two-tone green livery. Features include free WiFi, USB power and audio-visual next stop announcements. Though there has not been any official announcement from the company, the Keighley Jets livery has seemingly been retired from its fleet, though the routes still maintain their K prefix and features mentioned above.

Otley Dash 
In October 2017, took over operation of service 965 (Otley and Weston) from First Leeds. Initially encompassed under the Wharfedale Links brand, the service was rebranded Otley Dash in March 2021. It is operated by Optare Solo single-deck vehicles, branded in a two-tone green and yellow livery.

The Shuttle 
The Shuttle brand is used on service 662, which operates between Bradford and Keighley via Shipley. The service is operated by a fleet of Volvo B7RLE/Wright Eclipse Urban single-deck vehicles, branded in a two-tone blue livery. Features include free WiFi and USB charging.

Wharfedale Links 
In October 2016, the company gained the contract for services 963 (Holt Park and Wharfedale Hospital), 966 (Guiseley and Yeadon) and 967 (Leeds Bradford Airport and Menston), which operate under the which operate under the Wharfedale Links brand. The services are operated by a fleet of Optare Solo single-deck vehicles, branded in a two-tone green and yellow livery.

Fleet and operations

Depots 
As of April 2022, the company operates two depots in the market town of Keighley.

Vehicles 
As of April 2022, the fleet consists of in the region of 125 buses. The fleet consists of diesel-powered single and double-deck buses manufactured by Optare, Wrightbus and Volvo, as well as minibuses manufactured by Mellor.

Notes

References

External links
 
 Keighley & District Travel and Transdev Blazefield Limited on Companies House
The Keighley Bus Company website

Bus operators in West Yorkshire
Keighley
Transdev